Straßburger or Strassburger may refer to:

 Straßburger Wurstsalat, a type of Wurstsalat, or sausage salad
 Straßburger Münster, a name for the Strasbourg Cathedral
 Straßburger FV, a former name of the AS Strasbourg football team

People with the surname 
 John Strassburger (1942-2010), American educator
 Ralph B. Strassburger (1883–1959), American businessman
 Wilhelm Straßburger (1907-1991), German footballer

See also 
 Strasburger
 Strasburg (disambiguation)
 Strassberg (disambiguation)

German-language surnames